Baron Kenswood, of St Marylebone in the County of London, is a title in the Peerage of the United Kingdom. It was created in 1951 for the professional violinist and welfare worker for the blind, Ernest Whitfield.  the title is held by his grandson, the third Baron, who succeeded in 2016.

Barons Kenswood (1951)
Ernest Albert Whitfield, 1st Baron Kenswood (1887–1963)
John Michael Howard Whitfield, 2nd Baron Kenswood (1930–2016)
Michael Christopher Whitfield, 3rd Baron Kenswood (b. 1955)

The heir presumptive is the present holder's younger brother Hon. Anthony John Whitfield (b. 1957)
The heir presumptive's heir, and the next heir-in-line, is his son Peter Daniel Whitfield (b. 1981)

Arms

Notes

References

Kidd, Charles, Williamson, David (editors). Debrett's Peerage and Baronetage (1990 edition). New York: St Martin's Press, 1990, 

Baronies in the Peerage of the United Kingdom
Noble titles created in 1951